Helena Grossówna (1904, Thorn, German Empire – 1994, Warsaw, Poland) was a Polish actress and dancer, who starred in several popular Polish films during the interwar period.
She worked as a waitress during the German occupation of Poland, and at the same time, she served as an officer (lieutenant) in the Polish underground. During the Warsaw Uprising of 1944, she was in command of a women's section of the battalion "Sokół" (Eng. falcon), for which she was highly decorated.

Selected filmography
 Kochaj tylko mnie (1935)
 Dodek na froncie (1936)
 Piętro wyżej (1937)
 A Diplomatic Wife (1937)
 Florian (1938)
 Paweł i Gaweł (1938)
 Szczęśliwa trzynastka (1938)
 Zapomniana melodia (1938)
 Królowa przedmieścia (1938)
 Robert and Bertram (1938)
 The Vagabonds (1939)
 The Two Who Stole the Moon (1962)

In 2013 the Polish Post issued a commemorative stamp of her, with Adolf Dymsza and Mieczysława Ćwiklińska.

Bibliography
 Skaff, Sheila. The Law of the Looking Glass: Cinema in Poland, 1896-1939. Ohio University Press, 2008.

External links

1904 births
1994 deaths
Polish film actresses
People from Toruń
Polish female dancers
Warsaw Uprising insurgents
Home Army members
Polish stage actresses
Polish cabaret performers
Recipients of the Cross of Valour (Poland)
20th-century Polish actresses
20th-century comedians
Polish women in World War II resistance